The Croatian Bishops' Conference (HBK) is an episcopal conference of the Catholic Church in Croatia. The Conference was founded on May 15, 1993 after Croatia regained its independence after the breakup of Yugoslavia in the early 1990s, which consequentially led to the abolition of the Bishops' Conference of Yugoslavia. HBK is composed of all active and retired bishops; currently 32 (20 active, 11 retired, 1 military ordinary).

History
During the breakup of Yugoslavia, Croatia declared its independence on June 25, 1991. The Holy See recognized  Croatia on January 13, 1992. Croatian bishops made a proposal for the establishment of the Croatian Bishops' Conference.

On May 15, 1993, the Holy See issued a decree by which it established governing body for the Croatian dioceses-Croatian Bishops' Conference. Archbishop of Zagreb, Cardinal Franjo Kuharić, was elected as a first Conference President.

The HBK Statute was renewed on February 5, 2000. Cardinal Josip Bozanić served as Conference president in two terms (1997-2007). At the HBK plenary session in October 2007 in the town of Gospić, Archbishop of Đakovo-Osijek Marin Srakić was elected as the President. Vice-Presidents of the Conference were Cardinal Josip Bozanić and Archbishop of Split-Makarska Marin Barišić. At the 45th session of the HBK that was held on November 14, 2012 Archbishop of Zadar Želimir Puljić was elected as the fourth Conference President.

HBK and Bishops' Conference of Bosnia and Herzegovina takes care of the pastoral care of Croatian Catholics abroad. They also appoint together Episcopal Commission for the Pontifical Croatian College of St. Jerome in Rome. In addition, their common question are also liturgical books in Croatian. According to this, both Conferences have an annual common season.

HBK is a member of Council of the Bishops' Conferences of Europe and Commission of the Bishops' Conferences of the European Community.

Organisation
Conference bodies are:
Episcopal Commission (for: 1. Liturgy, 2. Relations with the European Union, 3. Croatian Caritas, 4. Relations with the State, 3. a Dialogue with the Serbian Orthodox Church, 4. Pontifical Croatian College of St. Jerome)
Councils (for: 1. the Doctrine of Faith, 2. Catechizing, 3. Clergy, 4. Seminaries and Vocations, 5. Institutes of Consecrated Life, 6. Life and Family, 7. Laity, 8. Education, 9. Ecumenism and Dialogue, 10. Cultural and Church Cultural Assets, 11. Missions, 12. Pastoral Care of Migrants with committees for Pastoral Care of Tourists and Pastoral Care of Sailors, 13. Croatia Foreign Congregation with the National Office for the Croatian Foreign Congregation)
Commissions (1. Legal, 2. "Iustitia et Pax" (Justice and peace), 3. Joint Commission of the Croatian Bishops' Conference, 4. Croatian Conference of Major Superiors and Croatian Union of Major Superiors)
Committees (for: 1. Youth, 2. Social Communication, 3. Pastoral Care of Prisoners, 4. Pastoral Care of Roma)
General Secretariat
Offices of the General Secretariat (for: 1. Finances, 2. National Catechism, 3. Media, 4. Family, 5. Secular Societies, Movements and Communities, 6. Youth)
Institutes (1. Central Institution of the HBK for maintaining clergy and other officers, 2. Croatian Caritas, 3. Croatian Catholic Radio, 4. Catholic Press Agency, 5. Center for the Promotion of the Social Doctrine of the Church, 6. Croatian Institute for Liturgical Pastoral)

The President and Vice President shall be elected for the time period of three years by bishops, with term renewable twice.

Members 
Members of the Croatian Bishops' Conference are:
Active bishops: 

Retired bishops:

Presidents

 Franjo Kuharić (1993–1997)
 Josip Bozanić (1997–2007)
 Marin Srakić (2007–2012)
 Želimir Puljić (2012–2022)
 Dražen Kutleša (since 2022)

See also
Catholic Church in Croatia

References

External links
 Croatian Bishops' Conference website (Croatian)
 Croatian Bishops' Conference webpage. GCatholic.org website

Croatia
Catholic Church in Croatia
Religious organizations based in Croatia
Catholic organizations established in the 20th century
Christian organizations established in 1993
1993 establishments in Croatia